Iron Range Off-Highway Vehicle State Recreation Area is a State Park unit located east of Lake Ore-be-gone in Gilbert, Minnesota. A  expansion of the recreation area is also being planned, with land acquisition underway.

The recreation area has trails for all classes of off-highway vehicles defined by the Minnesota Department of Natural Resources, including Off-Highway Motorcycles, Class I All-Terrain Vehicles, Class II All-Terrain Vehicles, and Off-Road Vehicles.

Minnesota is one of three states to have a state-maintained off-road recreation area, the others being California and Utah.

References

External links
 Iron Range OHV State Recreation Area at Minnesota Department of Natural Resources.
 Trail Map
 Iron Range Off-Highway Vehicle Recreation Area at Irontrail.com.

Protected areas of St. Louis County, Minnesota
State parks of Minnesota
2002 establishments in Minnesota
Protected areas established in 2002